Giovanni Carta, also known as John Carta (Alghero, January 7, 1946 – Sacramento, September 29, 1990), was an Italian American airman and parachutist, veteran of the Vietnam War.

He was nicknamed Birdman. Carta was a Base Jumping pioneer and a veteran of the Vietnam War, where he piloted Bell UH-1 Iroquois helicopters on rescue missions. He was decorated with the War Cross for Military Valor.

He parachuted onto the roof of the World Trade Center in New York in 1981; and launched himself from a tower of the Verrazano Bridge in 1982.

In 1986, using a portable ramp, he jumped from the Foresthill Bridge in California on a motorcycle then deployed his parachute, leaving the motorcycle to smash to pieces in the canyon below.

He jumped from the Leaning Tower of Pisa, in Italy, and from George Washington Bridge in New York, in 1987.

He experimented with bat wings in many of his parachute launches.

On August 16, 1990, he broke his back after his parachute failed during a jump from an office building in Oakland; he was charged with trespass but the charge was dropped due to his injuries.

Carta was killed on September 29, 1990, when the Lockheed PV-2 Harpoon in which he was a passenger crashed during an impromptu aerobatics display.

Bibliography 
 Jordan Fisher Smith, Nature noir, Houghton Mifflin Harcourt, 2005.  
 Michael Abrams, Birdmen, Batmen, And Skyflyers, 2006, Harmony Books.  
 Massimiliano Fois e Raffaele Sari Bozzolo, Un'altra Alghero, 2008 Panoramika editrice. ,

References

External links 
Trailer of the documentary by Sky Circus on John Carta
List of newspaper articles about John Carta

Skydivers
People from Alghero
1946 births
1990 deaths
People of Sardinian descent